Helianthus neglectus is a species of sunflower known by the common names neglected sunflower. It is native to the southwestern United States in southeastern New Mexico and West Texas.

Helianthus neglectus grows on sand dunes and other sandy soil. This wildflower is an annual herb up to 200 cm (almost 7 ft) tall, growing from a thick, fleshy taproot. One plant produces one to five flower heads containing 21-31 yellow ray florets surrounding 150 or more red or purple disc florets.

Helianthus neglectus hybridizes with several other species in the region: H. annuus, H. debilis, and H. petiolaris.

References

External links
Lady Bird Johnson Wildflower Center, University of Texas

neglectus
Flora of the Western United States
Plants described in 1958